Toyouke-Ōmikami is the goddess of agriculture and industry in the Shinto religion. Originally enshrined in the Tanba region of Japan, she was called to reside at Gekū, Ise Shrine, about 1,500 years ago at the age of Emperor Yūryaku to offer sacred food to Amaterasu Ōmikami, the Sun Goddess.

While popular as Toyouke-Ōhmikami presently, her name has been transcribed using Chinese characters in several manners including  in "Kojiki", while there is no entry about her in "Nihon Shoki". Literally, her name means kami of "Luxuriant-food Princess".

God and goddess thought to be identical to Toyouke-Ōhmikami are a god  and a goddess .

There is a separate shrine dedicated to Toyouke's Ara-mitama, or  called  (Takamiya) inside Gekū.

Mythology 

In Kojiki, Toyouke-Ōmikami is described as the granddaughter to Izanami via her father Wakumusubi, and Toyouke was said to settle to Gekū, Ise Shrine at  after Tenson kōrin when the heavenly deities came down to the earth. In her name Toyouke, "uke" means food, or being the goddess of food and grain, which is said to be the basis that other kami were equated and merged into Toyouke as the deity of foodstuff: Uke Mochi (Ōgetsu-hime), Inari Ōkami, and Ukanomitama.

The head priest of Toyouke Daijingū submitted "", or the record of the Ise Grand Shrine to the government in 804, in which it is told that goddess Toyouke originally had come from Tamba. It records that Emperor Yūryaku was told by Amaterasu in his dream that she alone was not able to supply enough food, so that Yūryaku needed to bring , or the goddess of divine meals, from Hijino Manai in ancient Tanba Province.

Stories among various Fudoki indicate the origin of Toyouke: In that of Tango, or "",  had been bathing with other seven deities at Manai spring on the hilltop of Hiji in Tamba province, when an old couple hid Toyouke's heavenly robe so that she was not able to return to the heavenly world. Toyouke tended over ten years to that old couple and brew sake which cured any ailment, but was expelled from the household and wandered to reach and settle at Nagu village as a local deity. The anecdote in the Fudoki of Settsu Province "Settsu-no-kuni fudoki" mentions that  had lived in Tango.

Faith and rituals

The original location 
In Mineyama Town, Kyōtango, Kyoto prefecture, there is a well  and a story of the now lost half-moon-shaped rice paddy . They are believed to be the site where Toyouke had soaked rice seeds to encourage germination and planted the first rice. The  is mentioned in Engishiki dating back to Heian period, as  literally meaning the Garden of Rice Paddies.

On the slope of the Kuji Pass, there is a shrine dedicated to Ōkami, as well as  Hoi no dan, the ruin of a sacred well Ame no manai of Takamagahara: That well was entered both in Kojiki and Nihonshoki, and was also the highest title  given to water bodies.

There is a shrine named Moto-Ise  in Ōemachi, Fukuchiyama City to the south of Naiku of Moto-Ise uphill the Funaokayama. Its name literally means former Ise, where the priesthood has been inherited by Kawada clan, the further relative of the Fujiwara clan.

Amaterasu and Toyouke 
Emperor Sujin appointed imperial daughter  as a Saiō to serve "as a cane for Amaterasu" to find a new location to reside, and dispatched Toyosuki-iri to travel from present day Nara to neighboring areas. It is said that on the route, several locations hosted the spirit of Amaterasu by building her shrines, while Tango had the first of such shrines among the list of  sites. Those shrines honor Amaterasu as their main kami are:
Geku, Ise Jingu (Ise, Mie Prefecture),
Nagusha (Kyōtango, Kyoto prefecture),
Okumiya Ama no manai Shrine, Kono jinja (Miyazu, Kyoto prefecture), and
 (Kyōtango).

In addition, Toyouke-Ōmikami is worshiped at many branches of Ise shrines called Shimmei shrines, along with Amaterasu, and separate shrines are often built on the property of regular shrines for Toyouke-Ōmikami. There are also Inari shrines where they build alters for Toyouke as well.

According to the discipline of Ise Shintō (Watarai Shintō) originated by a priest at Geku named , Toyouke-Ōmikami is recognized as the first divine being which appeared in this world. In their idea, Toyouke is also identical to Ame no minakanushi and Kuni no tokotachi. In this sect of Shinto, Geku, or the shrine of Toyouke-Ōmikami, is treated as ranked higher than Naiku, or the shrine of Amaterasu.

See also 
 List of Japanese deities
 Honji suijaku

Sources 
  Originally published in 1954.

Footnotes

Notes

References

Further reading 

 Anzu, Motohiko. "" . pp. 1–18, . (79). Taisha, Shimane : Shinto gakkai (ed.), November 1973, .
 "Inner shrine, Ise, early 1st cent. (rebuilt 1993)". Winnipeg : University of Manitoba, 2003. Series: UML Slide Survey set. . 1 black and white slide.
 Kohori, Kunio; Hibi, Sadao. (1996) "". Karābukkusu, 890, Tokyo : Hoikusha. , .
 Kohori, Kunio.(2011) "". Kyoto : Tankōsha. , .
 Picken, Stuart D. B.  "Faith-Based Schools in Japan: Paradoxes and Pointers". Chapman, Judith D.; International Handbook of Learning, Teaching and Leading in Faith-Based Schools; 515–531; Springer Netherlands : Dordrecht.

Japanese goddesses
Agricultural goddesses
Food deities
Harvest goddesses
Kunitsukami